Prasanna Venkatesa Perumal Temple is a Hindu temple located in the town of Thanjavur in Tamil Nadu, India. The presiding deity is Vishnu. The temple was constructed by the Thanjavur Maratha king Pratapsingh in the 18th century. 

The temple is associated with the life of Carnatic composer Muthuswami Dikshitar who has written many songs here. Annual kutcheris are held during the Tamil month of Aadi in his memory.

References 
 Prasanna Venkatesa Perumal Temple
 Thanjavur Palace Devasthanam: Prasanna Venkatesa Perumal Temple
 

Vishnu temples
Hindu temples in Thanjavur